The 2002 Vuelta a España was the 57th edition of the Vuelta a España, one of cycling's Grand Tours. The Vuelta began in Valencia, with a team time trial on 7 September, and Stage 11 occurred on 18 September with a stage to Collado Villalba. The race finished in Madrid on 29 September.

Stage 1
7 September 2002 — Valencia ,  (TTT)

Stage 2
8 September 2002 — Valencia to Alcoy,

Stage 3
9 September 2002 — San Vicente del Raspeig to Murcia,

Stage 4
10 September 2002 — Águilas to Roquetas de Mar,

Stage 5
11 September 2002 — El Ejido to Sierra Nevada,

Stage 6
12 September 2002 — Granada to Sierra de la Pandera,

Stage 7
13 September 2002 — Jaén to Málaga,

Stage 8
14 September 2002 — Málaga to Ubrique,

Stage 9
15 September 2002 — Córdoba to Córdoba,

Stage 10
16 September 2002 — Córdoba to Córdoba, (ITT)

Stage 11
18 September 2002 — Alcobendas to Collado Villalba,

References

2002 Vuelta a España
Vuelta a España stages